Instituto O'Higgins is a private Catholic school located in the center of Rancagua, Chile. It is administered by the Marist Brothers.

It was founded in 1915 by four Marist Brothers, Andrés, Donato, Cristobal and Salvador María. Originally the institute was exclusively for boys, but since year 2000, girls have been allowed as well.

In 1925 the school created his own soccer team, the Club de Deportes Instituto O'Higgins, that was merged in 1954 with the Braden Copper Company team, creating the O'Higgins Braden club. One year later, in 1955, O'Higgins Braden merged with América de Rancagua football club, forming the current Club Deportivo O'Higgins.

This school has a sports park called Estadio Marista (Marist Stadium), located in the town of Machalí, near Rancagua.

Rectors 
The rectors of the school had been:

See also
 List of Marist Brothers schools

References

External links

 
 Chilean Marist Brothers

O'Higgins F.C.
Schools in Cachapoal Province
Marist Brothers schools
Catholic schools in Chile
Educational institutions established in 1915
Rancagua
1915 establishments in Chile
Private schools in Chile